This is a list of the tallest buildings in Chile, ranking high-rises that stand at least 95 metres (311 ft) tall.

Completed

Under construction

See also
List of tallest buildings in South America

References

Tallest
Chile

Chile